Edward van de Vendel (born 1 August 1964) is a Dutch writer of children's literature.

Early life 

Van de Vendel was born in 1964 in Leerdam, Netherlands. He worked as a teacher for several years before becoming a full-time writer in 2001.

Career 

Van de Vendel made his poetry debut in 1996 with Betrap me.

In 2001, Van de Vendel published Wat rijmt er op puree?, the Kinderboekenweekgeschenk, a publication on the occasion of the annual Boekenweek (Dutch Book Week).

In 2004, he won the Woutertje Pieterse Prijs together with Fleur van der Weel for the book Superguppie. In 2016, he also won the Woutertje Pieterse Prijs together with Martijn van der Linden for the book Stem op de okapi.

His books have been illustrated by various illustrators, including Alice Hoogstad, Fleur van der Weel, Martijn van der Linden, Sebastiaan Van Doninck and Sylvia Weve.

Awards 

 1999: Gouden Zoen, Gijsbrecht
 2000: Gouden Zoen, De dagen van de bluegrassliefde
 2001: Zilveren Griffel, Dom Konijn
 2004: Woutertje Pieterse Prijs (with Fleur van der Weel), Superguppie
 2007: Gouden Zoen, Ons derde lichaam
 2008: Zilveren Griffel, Eén miljoen vlinders
 2009: Zilveren Griffel, Opa laat zijn tenen zien
 2009: Glazen Globe, De gelukvinder
 2010: Jenny Smelik-IBBY-prijs, De gelukvinder
 2010: Zilveren Griffel, Fluit zoals je bent
 2011: Zilveren Griffel, Hoera voor Superguppie!
 2016: Woutertje Pieterse Prijs (with Martijn van der Linden), Stem op de okapi
 2019: Zilveren Griffel, Vosje
 2019: Anna Blaman Prijs

References

External links 

 
 Edward van de Vendel (in Dutch), Digital Library for Dutch Literature

1964 births
Living people
Dutch children's writers
20th-century Dutch male writers
21st-century Dutch male writers
Woutertje Pieterse Prize winners